This list of electoral wards in Bridgend County Borough includes council wards, which elect councillors to Bridgend County Borough Council and community wards, which elect councillors to community councils. As of 2022 there are 28 county borough wards and 49 community council wards.

Wards 1995
At the 1995 elections to Bridgend County Borough Council 48 county councillors were elected from 28 electoral wards, as follows (numbers of councillors in brackets):

Wards 1999
Since The County Borough of Bridgend (Electoral Arrangements) Order 1998 (and from the 1999 county council elections) the county borough has been divided into 39 electoral wards electing 54 county councillors. Six of these wards are coterminous with communities (civil parishes) of the same name.  Some communities have their own elected council.  The following table lists council wards, communities and associated geographical areas. Communities with a community council are indicated with a '*':

* = Communities which elect a community council

2019 review
In January 2019 a consultation period began, to review the wards and representation in the county. It was proposed to reduce the number of electoral wards for 39 to 32, with a reduction in councillors from 54 to 52.

The final proposals would see the number of wards reduced from 39 to 28. The number of coucillors was to drop from 54 to 51. These changes took effect from the 2022 council election.

County and community wards 2022
Following The County Borough of Bridgend (Electoral Arrangements) Order 2021 (effective from the 2022 county council elections) the county borough has been divided into 28 electoral wards electing 51 county councillors. Four of the wards are coterminous with communities of the same name. Some communities have their own elected council. There are 49 community council wards electing up to 236 community councillors.

The following table lists council wards, communities and associated geographical areas. Communities with a community council are indicated with a '*':

See also
 List of electoral wards in Mid Glamorgan
 List of electoral wards in Wales

References

Bridgend County